David Paver Mellor (19 March 1903 – 9 January 1980) was an Australian inorganic chemist, and was the Professor of Inorganic Chemistry at the University of New South Wales from 1955 to 1969.

Publications 
Mellor, D. P., 'The Development of Coordination Chemistry in Australia', Records of the Australian Academy of Science, vol. 3, no. 2, 1976.
Mellor, D.P., 'Obituary: Richard Thomas Baker', Journal and Proceedings of the Royal Society of New South Wales, vol. 76, 1942.
Mellor, D.P., 'Founders of Australian Chemistry. Archibald Liversidge', The Royal Australian Chemical Institute Proceedings, vol. 24, August 1957,
Mellor, D.P., 'H. G. Smith. A Pioneer in Australian Phytochemistry', The Royal Australian Chemical Institute Proceedings, vol. 27, 1960.
Mellor, D.P., 'Ronald Sidney Nyholm (1917–1971): Obituary', Search, vol. 3, no. 11/12, 1972.

References

Livingstone, Stanley E., 'Mellor, David Paver (1903–1980), Professor of Chemistry', in John Ritchie (ed.), Australian Dictionary of Biography, vol. 15, Melbourne University Press, Melbourne, 2000, pp. 347–348. Also available at http://www.adb.online.anu.edu.au/biogs/A150409b.htm.
Mellor, D. P., 'Liversidge, Archibald (1846–1927), scientist', in Douglas Pike (ed.), Australian Dictionary of Biography, vol. 5, Melbourne University Press, Melbourne, 1974, pp. 93–94.
Mellor, D. P., 'Challinor, Richard Westman (1874–1951), chemist', in Bede Nairn and Geoffrey Serle (eds), Australian Dictionary of Biography, vol. 7, Melbourne University Press, Melbourne, 1979, pp. 601–602.

External links 

Biography

1903 births
Australian chemists
University of Tasmania alumni
1980 deaths
Academic staff of the University of New South Wales